Lai Qirui (born 18 January 1998) is a Chinese footballer.

Career statistics

Club

Notes

References

1998 births
Living people
Chinese footballers
Chinese expatriate footballers
Association football midfielders
Serbian First League players
FK Sinđelić Beograd players
Chinese expatriate sportspeople in Serbia
Expatriate footballers in Serbia